Arlan Richardson is the Professor of Geriatric Medicine and the Donald W. Reynolds Endowed Chair of Aging Research at OUHSC and Senior VA Career Scientist at the Oklahoma City VA Medical Center. His research interests include Calorie Restriction and Aging, Oxidative Stress, and Molecular Biology of Aging. He is the director of the Oklahoma Nathan Shock Center on Aging. He is listed in Who's Who in Gerontology and is the founder of the Barshop Institute. In 2016, Richardson told CNN that Rapamycin is the best drug he'd ever seen in slowing aging.

Selected publications
Richardson, A., Liu, F., Adamo, M. L., Van Remmen, H., & Nelson, J. F. (2004). The role of insulin and insulin-like growth factor-I in mammalian ageing. Best Practice & Research Clinical Endocrinology & Metabolism, 18(3), 393-406.
Richardson, A. G., & Schadt, E. E. (2014). The role of macromolecular damage in aging and age-related disease. Journals of Gerontology Series A: Biomedical Sciences and Medical Sciences, 69(Suppl_1), S28-S32.
Richardson, A., Galvan, V., Lin, A. L., & Oddo, S. (2015). How longevity research can lead to therapies for Alzheimer's disease: The rapamycin story. Experimental gerontology, 68, 51-58.
Richardson, A., Fischer, K. E., Speakman, J. R., De Cabo, R., Mitchell, S. J., Peterson, C. A., ... & Austad, S. N. (2016). Measures of healthspan as indices of aging in mice—a recommendation. Journals of Gerontology Series A: Biomedical Sciences and Medical Sciences, 71(4), 427-430.
Selvarani, R., Mohammed, S., & Richardson, A. (2021). Effect of rapamycin on aging and age-related diseases—past and future. Geroscience, 43(3), 1135-1158.

Awards
 1993: Nathan Shock Award from the Gerontology Research Center at the National Institute on Aging for "his pioneering research on the effect of dietary restriction on gene expression" 
 1995: Robert W. Kleemeier Award for "outstanding research in the field of gerontology from the Gerontological Society of America" 
 2001: Harman Research Award for "research contributions in the field of aging and dietary restriction from the American Aging Association" 
 2021 OSU Agriculture Champion

References

American gerontologists
Living people
American molecular biologists
American biochemists
Year of birth missing (living people)